Manda Rin (real name Amanda MacKinnon, born 22 March 1977) is a Scottish singer, artist and songwriter. She is the singer and keyboard player of the Scottish indie rock band Bis, later fronted the Kitchen and also released a solo album. She also co-hosted a radio show on BBC Scotland called Air.

Rin was the only person ever to appear in two of the line up rounds on Never Mind the Buzzcocks. Her first appearance was never shown: one of the contestants on the programme was Russell Brand who, shortly after taping, became embroiled in a tabloid row after leaving messages on the answerphone of Andrew Sachs for his radio programme, resulting in Brand being banned from the BBC.

Music career

Bis
In 1994, Rin, along with the brothers Steven Clark (Sci-fi Steven) and John Clark (John Disco), formed the band Bis in Glasgow, Scotland. In March 1996, Bis performed their single "Kandy Pop" on Top of the Pops twice, which charted at number 25 in the UK Singles Chart. The lead single, "Eurodisco", from their second album, Social Dancing (1999), reached number 37. Bis toured extensively from 1996 to 2000, and achieved strong fan bases in Japan, the US and Australia. The band split in 2003, but in 2005 formed a new band, Data Panik, which lasted until the next year. Bis reformed in 2007 and released a fourth album, Data Panik Etcetera, in 2014. A fifth album, Slight Disconnects, followed in 2019.

Solo
Rin released a solo single, "Guilty Pleasure", and an EP, My DNA Sampler, in 2008, both on This Is Fake DIY Records. The next year, her EP My DNA was released, and a solo album of the same name followed in 2009.

Other work
Rin contributed vocals to tracks for the 1998 album Cat Food by J Church and Meister's 2004 album I Met the Music.

Rin also fronted the Kitchen with Ryan Seagrist from Alison Mosshart's first band, Discount, who released several singles and an album in 2003 on the Damaged Goods label. She later teamed up with Hyperbubble on a track for the group's 2011 album Drastic Cinematic and for the 2013 EP Hyperbubble + Manda Rin.

Following the first dissolution of Bis, MacKinnon became a DJ at nightclubs, most notably Death Disco at the Arches in Glasgow.

Artwork
Rin was responsible for the manga-inspired artwork on all of Bis's releases. Her sleeves aided the success of the band, most notably in Japan; she published a monthly comic strip in the Japanese magazine Buzz. More recently, Rin has held an exhibition of her work under the title "Cover Versions and Other Hits".

Personal life
In 2009, Rin revealed that she had been diagnosed with multiple sclerosis in 2005.

Rin married Stuart Memo in 2011.

References

External links
Official Bis website

1977 births
21st-century Scottish women singers
Living people
Place of birth missing (living people)
Scottish songwriters
Retard Disco artists